Illusion V is a super yacht built and developed by the Italian shipyard Benetti in partnership with the design office of  Green & Mingarelli for interior and exterior decoration. Measuring the total of 58 meters (190.29ft) in length, it can reach a speed of 15.5 knots. Its interior has six cabins for twelve guests, and a total crew of thirteen people. Currently .

References 

Individual yachts
Motor yachts
2014 ships